The Pines & the Devil is a 7-inch vinyl EP from Portugal. The Man.  It was put out right after Waiter: "You Vultures!" and includes two new songs that were later added to the digital EP Devil Say I, I Say AIR.

Track listing
 "The Pines" – 3:13
 "The Devil" – 2:29

Personnel
John Baldwin Gourley – lead vocals, guitar, keyboards
Zachary Scott Carothers – bass, backing vocals, percussion
Jason Sechrist – drums

References

2006 EPs
Portugal. The Man albums